Brusseline is a custom typeface developed in 2006 by Eric de Berranger for the signage of the Brussels Intercommunal Transport Company (STIB-MIVB), managing metro, premetro, tram, and bus services. The typeface started being used on the network in 2007 as part of a company image campaign. The name is inspired by Parisine, the typeface of Paris’ public transport network.

See also 
 Public signage typefaces

External links 
 , Eric de Berranger
  Brusseline & Natalie, Le Typographe.

Corporate typefaces
Government typefaces
Humanist sans-serif typefaces
Brussels Metro
Typefaces and fonts introduced in 2006
Display typefaces